Monsters vs. Aliens: Mutant Pumpkins from Outer Space is a 2009 Halloween television special, based on the film Monsters vs. Aliens. It was produced by DreamWorks Animation and directed by Peter Ramsey. The special premiered in Ireland on RTÉ One on October 26, 2009, and aired in the USA on the NBC network on October 28, 2009.

Plot   
One night, a UFO appears on Earth and drops a strange green goo into a large pumpkin field. When Farmer Jeb (Peter Ramsey) comes outside to investigate, he is attacked and captured by something lurking in the field. On Halloween day, Susan Murphy aka Ginormica (Reese Witherspoon) and her monster friends prepare for Halloween celebrations, though Dr. Cockroach P.H.D (Hugh Laurie) has no interest in the holiday because of a memory from his childhood involving bullies stealing a swirly pop, his favorite candy. The monsters' prospect of Halloween is cut short when General Monger (Kiefer Sutherland) tells them that aliens have been detected in Modesto, California and orders them to investigate. At Farmer Jeb's patch, pumpkins are mysteriously being given away for free, with one family taking the largest one that the son names Wicked Jack.

That night, the monsters visit Susan's parents, who have prepared for Halloween eccentrically. As Susan investigates the patch, the other monsters investigate the suburbs for aliens. Cockroach uses his scanner on various people while the Missing Link (Will Arnett) tries to scare people to no avail and B.O.B. (Seth Rogen) has trouble remembering what to say when walking up to houses for candy. Cockroach's interest in Halloween is rekindled when an old lady presents him with a swirly pop. However, all the pumpkins come to life as a result of saturation from the green goo; Susan discovers this as she locates a captured Farmer Jeb. As the pumpkins in the suburbs attack the children, Cockroach, Link, and B.O.B. come to their defense, during which Cockroach discovers that the pumpkins grow bigger by eating candy. The pumpkins fall under the command of a now-giant Wicked Jack (Rainn Wilson) and head straight for the Murphy house‒which had the most candy‒due to B.O.B.'s bungling.

Cockroach, Link, B.O.B., and the children rally against the pumpkins just as Susan turns up, but Wicked Jack fuses himself with the other pumpkins to become an even bigger giant. The monsters' attempts to defeat Wicked Jack seem to prove futile until Cockroach formulates a plan to overfeed the pumpkins with candy to bloat them up after seeing B.O.B. suffering from indigestion. While Susan keeps Wicked Jack distracted, the children‒backed up by Link and a Gatling gun platform built by Cockroach‒put Cockroach’s plan into action. When all the candy is eventually used up, Cockroach sacrifices his swirly pop to push Wicked Jack to indigestion. As her parents come outside just in time, Susan sucker-punches Wicked Jack's head off before signaling Butterflyosaurus (Jimmy Kimmel)‒who is dressed as Elvis Presley‒to destroy him. All the candy comes out unscathed and is collected by the children. As Cockroach gives his swirly pop to a young girl, Susan's parents admit that they will have to get used to "sharing her with the world". A single surviving pumpkin tries to sneak away but is found and scared into exploding by Link. General Monger eventually arrives to congratulate the monsters. Unbeknownst to them, green goo from the pumpkin Link scared saturates a planting of carrots, causing a mutant carrot to be formed.

Cast

 Reese Witherspoon as Susan Murphy/Ginormica
 Seth Rogen as B.O.B.
 Hugh Laurie as Dr. Cockroach Ph.D
 Will Arnett as The Missing Link
 Kiefer Sutherland as General W.R. Monger
 Rainn Wilson as Wicked Jack
 Jeffrey Tambor as Carl Murphy
 Julie White as Wendy Murphy
 Conrad Vernon as Man on Cell/Woman
 Rich Dietl as B.O.B. Kid/Husband/Young Man/Pumpkins
 Walt Dohrn as Link Kid
 Susan Fitzer as Little Girl
 Ava Kelly as Cat Girl
 Andrea Montana Knoll as Mom
 Latifa Ouaou as Boy/Old Lady
 Peter Ramsey as Dad/Farmer Jeb

Home media
The special was first released on DVD in the UK on September 27, 2010 exclusively at Tesco stores. In the US it was released as a stand-alone version on September 13, 2011, and on September 27, 2011, along with Scared Shrekless. It got its Blu-ray release on August 28, 2012, as a part of DreamWorks Spooky Stories.

Sequel

A sequel titled Night of the Living Carrots was released in October 2011 in two parts exclusively on the Nintendo 3DS video service until receiving a general release on August 28, 2012 as part of the Shrek's Thrilling Tales DVD and DreamWorks Spooky Stories Blu-ray. It directly follows Mutant Pumpkins, Dr. Cockroach, Link and B.O.B. trying to defeat hundreds of zombie carrots.

References

External links
 

2009 animated films
2009 computer-animated films
2009 films
2009 television specials
American animated science fiction films
DreamWorks Animation animated short films
Films directed by Peter Ramsey
Films scored by Henry Jackman
Animated films about extraterrestrial life
Halloween television specials
NBC television specials
Monsters vs. Aliens (franchise)
American films about Halloween
Science fiction television specials
2000s animated television specials
2000s American films